Tarsicius or Tarcisius was a martyr of the early Christian church who lived in the 3rd century. The little that is known about him comes from a metrical inscription by Pope Damasus I, who was pope in the second half of the 4th century.

History
The only positive information concerning this Roman martyr is found in a poem composed in his honour by Pope Damasus (366–384), who compares him to the deacon Saint Stephen and says that, as Stephen was stoned by a crowd, so Tarcisius, carrying the Blessed Sacrament, was attacked by a group and beaten to death.

Nothing else definite is known concerning Tarcisius. Since Damasus compares him to Stephen, he may have been a deacon; however, a 6th-century account makes him an acolyte. According to one version of the detailed legend that developed later, Tarcisius was a young boy during one of the fierce 3rd-century Roman persecutions, probably during the reign of Emperor Valerian (253–259). One day, he was entrusted with the task of bringing the Eucharist to condemned Christians in prison. He preferred death at the hands of a mob rather than deliver to them the Blessed Sacrament which he was carrying.

Veneration 
He was originally buried in the Catacombs of San Callisto and the inscription by Damasus was placed later on his tomb. Some time later his relics were moved to the San Silvestro in Capite church in Rome. His feast day is celebrated on 15 August; that day is widely observed as the Feast of the Assumption, therefore he is not mentioned in the General Roman Calendar, but only in the Roman Martyrology.

Patronage
He is the patron saint of altar servers and first communicants.

Legacy
His story was greatly expanded by Cardinal Nicholas Wiseman, who portrays him as a young acolyte in his novel Fabiola, or the Church in the Catacombs.

The municipality of Saint-Tharcisius in Quebec, Canada, is named after him, as well as a 35 kilogram (77 lb) bell in the Stephansdom in Vienna, Austria.  

Saint José Sánchez del Río was nicknamed "Tarcisius".

Poem by Damasus

The first five lines say that both Stephen (the protomartyr) and Tarcisius are equal in merit, and Stephen's death (as recorded in the Acts of the Apostles) is retold poetically. The last four lines can be translated as:

When an insane gang pressed saintly Tarcisius, who was carrying the sacraments of Christ, to display them to the profane, he preferred to be killed and give up his life rather than betray to rabid dogs the heavenly body.

References

External links
 San Tarsicio
 San Tarcisio
Pope Benedict XVI, General Audience, August 4, 2010
 True Stories for First Communicants, Neumann Press, (1919)

Christian child saints
3rd-century Christian martyrs
Year of birth unknown

Year of death unknown